Hartlepool College can refer to:
 Hartlepool College of Further Education
 Hartlepool Sixth Form College